This page discusses the rivers and hydrography of the state of Queensland, Australia.

The principal topographic feature of Queensland is the series of low highlands and plateaus called the Great Dividing Range, which extend from north to south roughly parallel to the coast of the Coral Sea of the South Pacific Ocean.

The four main categories of rivers in Queensland, are those that rise on the eastern slopes of the Great Dividing Range and flow eastwards to the sea, the Coastal rivers; those that rise on the other side of the crest of the range and flow north-westward, towards the Gulf of Carpentaria, the Gulf rivers; those that also rise on the other side of the crest of the range and flow south-westward, forming part of the Murray–Darling basin, the Murray–Darling rivers; and those that generally rise in the west of the state and flow south-westward, towards the Lake Eyre basin, the Lake Eyre rivers. One river is isolated and does not flow towards any other basin or sea.

Major rivers
The following rivers are the longest river systems, by length.

Coastal rivers

Gulf rivers

Murray–Darling rivers

Lake Eyre rivers

Isolated river

See also

 List of rivers of Australia for an alphabetical listing including rivers in other Australian states

References

 
Lists of rivers of Australia
Rivers